White Hill is a mountain located in the Catskill Mountains of New York northeast of North Franklin. Coe Hill is located northeast and Jackson Hill is located southwest of Coe Hill.

References

Mountains of Delaware County, New York
Mountains of New York (state)